The 1983–84 SM-liiga season was the ninth season of the SM-liiga, the top level of ice hockey in Finland. 10 teams participated in the league, and Tappara Tampere won the championship.

Standings

Playoffs

Quarterfinals
 Kärpät - Ilves 2:0 (5:1, 4:3)
 HIFK - TPS 0:2 (3:6, 5:6)

Semifinal
 Tappara - TPS 3:2 (2:3, 3:6, 2:1, 5:3, 3:1)
 Ässät - Kärpät 3:2 (3:1, 3:5, 3:2, 2:9, 5:4)

3rd place
 Kärpät - TPS 2:1 (2:4, 6:4, 7:2)

Final
 Tappara - Ässät 3:1 (4:5, 6:3, 3:2, 4:3)

Relegation
 Lukko Rauma - HPK Hämeenlinna 3:2 (8:2, 4:6, 7:2, 4:5 OT, 3:1)
 Kiekko-Reipas Lahti - JyP HT Jyväskylä 3:1 (4:7, 5:4 OT, 4:3, 5:3)

External links
 SM-liiga official website

1983–84 in Finnish ice hockey
Fin
Liiga seasons